Liolaemus ortizii, Ortiz's tree iguana, is a species of lizard in the family Iguanidae.  It is endemic to Peru.

References

ortizii
Lizards of South America
Reptiles of Peru
Endemic fauna of Peru
Reptiles described in 1982
Taxa named by Raymond Laurent